Events that occurred during the year 1813 in Sweden, including births and deaths.

Incumbents
 Monarch – Charles XIII

Events
 - First publication of the newspaper Göteborgs-Posten.
 7 December - Battle of Bornhöved (1813).
 13 December - Swedish East India Company is dissolved.
 - Unmarried women of legal majority, "Unmarried maiden, who has been declared of legal majority", are given the right to vote in the sockestämma (local parish council, the predecessor of the communal councils), and the kyrkoråd (church councils).  
 - The Royal Swedish Academy of Agriculture and Forestry is founded.
 - The Royal Central Gymnastics Institute is founded.
 - The notorious criminal transvestite Lasse-Maja is arrested and becomes famous.

Births

 16 June – Charlotta Almlöf, actress  (died 1882)
 21 May - Oscar Ahnfelt, composer and music publisher  (died 1882)

Deaths
 13 January - Eva Helena Löwen, politically active socialite, spy and royal favorite  (born 1743)
 21 August - Sophia Magdalena of Denmark, queen dowager  (born 1746)
 17 July – Fredrica Löf, actress  (born 1760)
 27 December - Gustaf Adolf Reuterholm, royal favorite and de facto regent of Sweden  (born 1756)
 Carl Johan Ingman, spy (born 1747)

References

 
Years of the 19th century in Sweden
Sweden